Swissnex is a network of education, research, innovation and art outposts aimed at connecting Switzerland with the world's innovation hubs. The network is managed by the State Secretariat for Education, Research and Innovation (SERI) in cooperation with the Federal Department of Foreign Affairs (FDFA). There are currently five Swissnex branches:  Boston (2000),  San Francisco (2003),  Shanghai, China (2008), Bangalore, India (2011) and Rio de Janeiro, Brazil (2013). One Swissnex office operated in Singapore from 2004 to 2015.
 
Since 2003, the network has relied on public and private funding (one third from the SERI and two thirds from other sources). Each Swissnex branch offers a variety of services to Swiss companies, academics, policy-makers, and others.

The SERI also maintains and develops a worldwide network of science and technology counselors sharing the Swissnex mission. Twelve science and technology counselors work at selected Swiss embassies.

Swissnex in Boston and New York
Swissnex in Boston, the network's first location, opened in 2000 to pioneer “science diplomacy" in Cambridge, Massachusetts. Situated strategically between the Massachusetts Institute of Technology and Harvard University, Swissnex in Boston and New York works closely with higher education institutions in both Switzerland and the Greater Northeastern US. The region, due to its highly dynamic startup ecosystem and leading role in biotech and biomedical research, is also fertile ground for Swissnex in Boston's startup programs.

In 2013, Swissnex in Boston and New York opened the New York Outpost in Manhattan. Since 2016, the office is actively involved in the planning of swissnex mobile, as part of the Swiss Pavilion at the Expo 2017 in Kazakhstan.

Swissnex in San Francisco 
Swissnex in San Francisco is located at pier 17. Services offered by Swissnex in San Francisco include public events, study tours, startup coaching, innovation consulting, press outreach, social media training, university affairs, alumni networking, workspace, and more. Swissnex in San Francisco hosts the three-month CTI Start-up US Market Entry Camp for Swiss startups, and worked on a two-year social media program for all Swiss institutions of higher education, now called the Digital Campus. Public events organized by Swissnex in San Francisco cover topics from augmented reality to astronomy to innovative design. It also maintains a blog called nextrends that reports news and insights from the American West in the fields of science, education, innovation.

Swissnex in China 
Swissnex in China, the Science Consulate of Switzerland in China, was founded in 2008 and is located in the heart of Shanghai. Working together with the Science, Education and Technology Section at the Embassy of Switzerland in China and Consulates-General in Chengdu, Guangzhou, Hong Kong and Shanghai, Swissnex in China connects the dots between Switzerland and China in science, research, education and innovation. The main goal of Swissnex in China is to establish a solid, long-lasting network of cooperation between Swiss and Chinese academics and researchers, serving as a base for bottom-up initiatives, as well as to help Swiss startups to prepare their first step in China, to discover the market, to meet professional coaches and to connect with local experts. Public events organized by Swissnex in China cover the future of work, AI, circular economy, quantum computing, fintech, sustainable design, and more.

Swissnex in India
Swissnex in India, Consulate General of Switzerland is located in India's startup capital and education hub, Bangalore, close to the central business district. Services offered by Swissnex in India include CTI India market entry camp covering fact finding (digital assistance) for startups, market validation (field immersion for 1-3 weeks) and market entry (1-3 months), focus group discussions for Swiss researchers, professors and startups, startup coaching, public events, university affairs, alumni networking, workspace, and more. Public events organized by Swissnex in India cover topics such as applied research, robotics, innovative design, augmented reality, sustainable architecture, and more.

Swissnex in Brazil
Swissnex in Brazil was first opened in Rio de Janeiro, in 2014. The office was inaugurated with the presence of the Federal Councillor Johann Schneider-Ammann, at the time head of the Federal Department of Economic Affairs, Education and Research. The Brazilian office was expanded with an outpost in São Paulo in October 2016.

Swissnex in Japan
Swissnex in Japan, Consulate of Switzerland, is located in Osaka and is the newest Swissnex location. On 24th of July 2021, the President of the Swiss Confederation, H.E. Guy Parmelin, announced the opening of a new Consulate of Switzerland in Osaka, Japan and the 6th Swissnex key location.  Swiss President Ignazio Cassis held the groundbreaking ceremony in the new Consulate offices on April 20, 2022, officially making Japan the 6th Swissnex location.

Inactive Locations

swissnex Singapore 
swissnex Singapore opened in 2004 and ceased its operations by the end of September 2015. The remaining two staff members from SERI have been transferred to the Science and Technology Office at the local FDFA office, the Embassy of Switzerland, Singapore.

See also
 Employment website
 Switzerland
 Education in Switzerland
 Science and technology in Switzerland

Notes and references

Further reading 
 "Jahresbericht 2006 über die Schweizer Häuser für wissenschaftlichen und technologischen Austausch" . Retrieved 26 June 2018.

External links
 
 Swiss State Secretariat for Education, Research and Innovation
 Swiss Academia and the Social Media Landscape
 Article on the Social Media program for Swiss higher education
 Gallatin Awards Ceremony honors those who inspired Swissnex
 Swissnex San Francisco Executive Director interviewed in article on innovative workspace in San Francisco
 ETH Zurich publication highlights Swissnex San Francisco director, Christian Simm
 The Digital Campus

Communications in Switzerland
Science and technology in Switzerland